The Governor of Bali is the Head of the Level I Region who holds the government in Bali along with the Deputy Governor and 55 members of the Bali Regional House of Representatives۔ The Governor and Deputy Governor of Bali are elected through general elections which are held every 5 years.

Governors
Below is a list of Governors who have held office in the province of Bali in Indonesia.

Governors of Bali

Notes

References

Bibliography
 
 

Bali